A midpoint is the middle point of a line segment in geometry.

Midpoint may also refer to:

 Midpoint (astrology)
 Midpoint (company)
 Midpoint (screenwriting)
 Midpoint (album), a 2022 album by Tom Chaplin
 Midpoint Café, a restaurant, souvenir and antique shop on US Route 66 in Adrian, Texas
 Midpoint Memorial Bridge, connects Fort Myers and Cape Cora in Florida
 Midpoint method, in numerical analysis
 MidPoint Music Festival, held in Cincinnati, Ohio
 Midpoint Trade Books, book sales, distribution, and marketing company founded in 1996

See also
 Start Point (disambiguation)
 Endpoint (disambiguation)
 Bullet (typography) (•) and interpunct ( · ) are both occasionally known as "mid point" or "mid dot".